Busby railway station is a railway station in the village of Busby, East Renfrewshire, Greater Glasgow, Scotland.

History 
The station was opened by the Busby Railway on 1 January 1866.

The 1914 edition of the Ordnance Survey map shows that there was once a goods yard immediately south-east of the present station. There was also a goods line (identified as a 'mineral railway') that branched southwards off the main line immediately south of Busby Station. It passed through the area now occupied by housing on Westerton Avenue and then swung south-westwards through what is currently woodland and a walkway. The line then terminated in a goods yard which was located in the modern day Field Road Industrial Estate.

There was also a station building on the down (Glasgow bound) line but this was destroyed by fire in 1965.

The line reduces from double to single track just to the east of the station, remaining single all the way to the terminus except for a passing loop near Hairmyres.  Signalling control is now handled by the West of Scotland SCC at Cowlairs, which replaced the former Glasgow Central signalling centre in 2008.

Services 

A few extra trains operate at weekday peak times.

Gallery

References

Notes

Sources 
 
 
 
 RAILSCOT on Busby Railway
 RAILSCOT on East Kilbride Line (Caledonian Railway)

External links
Annotated video footage of Busby railway station in 2016.

Railway stations in East Renfrewshire
SPT railway stations
Railway stations served by ScotRail
Railway stations in Great Britain opened in 1866
Former Caledonian Railway stations
1866 establishments in Scotland
Clarkston, East Renfrewshire